Frederick Clarence Holmes (July 1, 1878 – February 13, 1956) was a Major League Baseball first baseman and catcher.

In two career games, he had one hit in three at-bats. He batted and threw right-handed.

Holmes was born in Chicago, Illinois and died in Norwood Park, Chicago.

References

External links

1878 births
1956 deaths
New York Highlanders players
Chicago Cubs players
Major League Baseball first basemen
Brockton Shoemakers players
Grand Rapids Boers players
Wheeling Stogies players
St. Paul Saints (Western League) players
Decatur Commodores players
Baseball players from Chicago